Choice Provisions Inc., formerly known as Gaijin Games Inc. prior to June 2014, is an American-origin independent video game development studio, best known for their Bit.Trip series of video games.  The studio was founded in 2007 by Alex Neuse, Mike Roush, and Chris Osborn and is located in Santa Cruz, California.

History
Gaijin Games initially emerged in 2004. The founder, Alex Neuse, had been employed at LucasArts since 1997, but after the project he had been working on was cancelled, Neuse decided that he wanted greater creative freedom, which spurred him to create his own studio. However, the company was unable to acquire sufficient funds or support from a publisher, and all of its development endeavors were halted indefinitely when Neuse was offered the position of creative director at Santa Cruz Games.

At Santa Cruz Games, Mike Roush, Alex Neuse and Chris Osborn formed a friendship. Neuse, Roush and Osborn were involved in the development of several games tied into licensed properties, but they became dissatisfied with the restrictions on their creativity. Osborn, with his love for Chiptunes, Neuse with his affinity for Atari 2600 and Roush with his aesthetic and drive for unique experiences, shared the same philosophies of game design. Subsequently, the trio quit their jobs at Santa Cruz to start up Gaijin Games again.

Neuse had a variety of game ideas that he had sketched out in a notebook, which he pitched to Roush and Osborn. Eventually, they settled on their favorite six concepts and formed the idea of a series called '8-Bit: A series of six new classics in the 8-bit style for humans who enjoy fun'. Gaijin signed a publishing deal with Aksys Games, then ditched the previous title in favor of BIT.TRIP and began development on the first title. Danny Johnson joined Gaijin during the fifth game in the series. Between the fifth and sixth games, Gaijin collaborated with Different Cloth to bring an iPhone/iPod Touch game, lilt line, to the WiiWare service. After all six games in the series were completed, Osborn left Gaijin Games to form another independent studio known as Tracer. After Osborn's departure, Roush and Neuse took on the monikers of Co-Founders and Co-Creators of all Gaijin projects and creative endeavors.

Following the climax of the BIT.TRIP series, Gaijin Games announced that they are very interested in developing games for the Nintendo 3DS and have since obtained development kits for the handheld device. Their first 3DS title was released in 2011 and was revealed to be a compilation of the six BIT.TRIP games called Bit.Trip Saga. In February 2011, the studio also absorbed the small-time developer Robotube, founded by Jason Cirillo - Roush explained this move as an effort to branch out into "more experimental, casual games." After the studio was rebranded as Choice Provisions in June 2014, the Robotube subsidiary was also rebranded as "Minivisions." The first game released under the Minivisions label was Woah Dave!, which initially released on October 30, 2014.

After almost a 2-year development cycle, Gaijin Games completed the hit sequel to RUNNER, Runner2 on February 26, 2013. Runner2 sold over 1 million units within the first year.

In June 2014, the company announced it would be changing its name to Choice Provisions. The studio decided to change their name due to the arguably negative connotations of the term "gaijin" (meaning "foreigner" in Japanese).

Games

Bit.Trip series

Other games

References

External links
Choice Provisions website

American companies established in 2007
Companies based in Santa Cruz, California
Video game companies based in California
Video game development companies
Indie video game developers
Video game companies established in 2007
2007 establishments in California
Privately held companies based in California